Agios Nektarios may refer to:-

Places
Agios Nektarios, Patras
Ágios Nektários, Poros

Other
Saint Nectarios, Agios Nektarios in Greek
MV Agios Nektarios, an Empire F type coaster which sank near Patras in 1963